Victor Pete Thamel (born 1977) is an American sports reporter for ESPN. He previously worked for Yahoo Sports, Sports Illustrated, and the New York Times.

Early life 
Thamel was born in Ware, Massachusetts to  Peter V. Thamel. He was the sports editor at the high school paper.

Thamel graduated from Syracuse University's S.I. Newhouse School of Public Communications in 1999, where he majored in magazine. He began his sportswriting career during college at Syracuse, he served as sports editor of The Daily Orange for three years. During his time at Syracuse, Donovan McNabb was the Orange's quarterback, and Jim Boeheim's men's basketball team reached the national championship game in 1996.

Career 
After graduation, Thamel began covering college basketball for The Post-Standard in Syracuse, New York.

Thamel joined the New York Times in 2003  and spent nine years there as the national college sports reporter. In 2006, the New York Times nominated him for a Pulitzer Prize for national reporting. He left the Times in 2012 for Sports Illustrated as a senior writer, covering college football and basketball. Thamel joined Yahoo Sports in 2017 and covered college sports and the NFL.

He was hired by ESPN in 2022.

Thamel is a member of the Football Writers Association of America and has won numerous FWAA writing awards. He has also won several Associated Press Sports Editors (APSE) awards, including first place for beat reporting in 2017 and breaking news in 2011. He considers Peter King at Sports Illustrated and Joe Drape from the New York Times his biggest mentors.

Personal life
Thamel lives in South Boston. He got married in March 2021.

References 

1977 births
Living people
American reporters and correspondents
American sports journalists
ESPN people
People from Ware, Massachusetts
S.I. Newhouse School of Public Communications alumni
Sports Illustrated
The New York Times sportswriters
Yahoo! employees